John Dotson Lee Jr. (July 4, 1898 – December 12, 1965) was an American singer, dancer and actor known for voicing the role of Br'er Rabbit in Disney's Song of the South (1946) and as the clownish, cringing, tremulous-voiced shyster pseudo-lawyer Algonquin J. Calhoun in the CBS Amos 'n' Andy TV and radio comedy series in the early 1950s. His comedic portrayal of Calhoun was a highlight of a brilliant ensemble cast whose storylines remain eternally funny. Much of his career was spent in vaudeville, but he also performed in motion pictures, on recordings and in television. He released a record (as "Johnnie Lee") in July 1949 called "You Can't Lose A Broken Heart" (Columbia Records # 30172), with backup vocals by The Ebonaires. Lee also starred in an all-black musical comedy called "Sugar Hill" in 1949 at Las Palmas Theatre in California.

He died of a heart attack on December 12, 1965 age 67.

Discography
Song of the South: Soundtrack (1946)
You Can't Lose a Broken Heart (released July 1949)
Mickey Mouse's Birthday Party (1954)

Selected filmography

References

External links
 
 

1898 births
1965 deaths
20th-century American male actors
20th-century American singers
20th-century American male singers
African-American male actors
20th-century African-American male singers
American male film actors
American male television actors
American male voice actors
Male actors from Los Angeles
Vaudeville performers